Redmoon Theater was a Chicago based not-for-profit theatrical company under the direction of Jim Lasko and Frank Maugeri that specialized in site-specific productions emphasizing visual spectacle. Productions were often out of doors, sometimes ticketed, sometimes freely viewable in public spaces. It is now defunct.

Production history 
Redmoon Theater was founded in 1990 by puppeteer Blair Thomas and choreographer Lauri Macklin. In 1992, Macklin left and Thomas continued on his own until Jim Lasko joined the theater.    

Team garnered critical praise for their indoor theater productions of classic stories like Moby-Dick and Frankenstein, while beginning to explore how the same theatrical skills could activate outdoor spaces. Mr. Thomas left the theater in 1998, leaving it to Jim Lasko. In 2009, Mr. Lasko accepted a one-year appointment to become the Artist in Residence for the City of Chicago, and, after 13 years of working as an artist and community leader with the organization, Frank Maugeri assumed the role of Artistic Director. A year later, the duo joined forces to co-lead Redmoon. 

Redmoon has contributed to such projects as The Millennium Park Opening Ceremony, Art Institute Ground Breaking, the City of Chicago’s Looptopia Festival, and the 2009 Halloween celebrations before the First family.

Productions 
The company has created theater productions, community projects and large-scale, site-specific performances, that have been experienced across Chicago from Belmont Harbor and the Jackson Park Lagoon to the façade of the Museum of Contemporary Art. Redmoon has also worked in traditional theater venues from the stage of Harris Theater to Steppenwolf. In addition, the company has produced international projects in the Netherlands, Ireland, France, and Australia.

Major works 
For eight years (1995–2002), Redmoon produced All Hallows' Eve, a ritual performance during Halloween in Chicago's Logan Square neighborhood that in its final year brought an audience of over 10,000.

In 2007, Redmoon created a large-scale commissioned work for the newly created festival Looptopia, which featured site installations throughout the Loop with a procession down Washington Street in a performance in Daley Plaza for more than 20,000 spectators.

In 2010, co-produced by Redmoon Theater and the Museum of Contemporary Art, Chicago, "The Astronaut's Birthday," a production reminiscent of a graphic novel, was projected onto the west façade of the MCA as audience members watched from the plaza.

Style 
With this unique visual language, Redmoon Theater aspired to transform streets and stages into places of public celebration, capable of speaking across cultural, ethnic, and generational boundaries that focuses on contributing to civic well-being and social exchange.

Highly influenced by contemporary art works and ancient theatrical forms, Redmoon Theater created a performance style that is part pageantry, gadgetry, acrobatics, and ephemera.

Critical reception 
The company has been hailed by the Chicago Tribune as “impossibly inventive” and “full of visual wit,” and described by the Chicago Sun-Times as “one of the only theaters that can keep a 2-year-old and a 50-year-old equally enchanted and filled with wide-eyed wonder.”

See also
Antonio Sacre
Chris Lafferty

References

Theatre companies in Chicago